Koznica (Albanian: Koznicë) is a mountain in eastern Kosovo, near the town of Artana. It is part of the Gollak mountains. The city of Pristina is located to the west of the mountain.

References

Mountains of Kosovo